North Korea competed as the Democratic People's Republic of Korea at the 1992 Summer Olympics in Barcelona, Spain.  It was the nation's first appearance in twelve years at the Summer Games due to its boycotting the 1984 Summer Olympics in Los Angeles, California and the 1988 Summer Olympics in Seoul. 64 competitors, 36 men and 28 women, took part in 53 events in 12 sports.

Medalists

Competitors
The following is the list of number of competitors in the Games.

Archery

Women's Individual Competition:
 Kim Jong-hwa — Round of 32, 19th place (0-1)
 Li Myong-gum — Round of 32, 29th place (0-1)
 Sin Song-hui — Ranking round, 52nd place (0-0)

Women's Team Competition:
 Kim, Li, and Sin — Quarterfinal, 7th place (1-1)

Athletics

Men's Marathon
 Ryu Ok-hyon — 2:40.51 (→ 80th place)

Women's Marathon
 Mun Gyong-ae — 2:37.03 (→ 6th place)

Women's Long Jump
 Ri Yong-ae 
 Heat — 6.17 m (→ did not advance)

Boxing

Men's Light Flyweight (– 48 kg)
 O Song-chol
 First Round – Defeated Anicet Rasoanaivo (MAD), KO-2
 Second Round – Lost to Daniel Petrov (BUL), RSC-3

Cycling

Three cyclists, all women, represented North Korea in 1992.

Women's Individual Road Race
 Pak Chun-wa — 2:38:38 (→ 53rd place)
 Kim Gyong-hui — 2:39:43 (→ 54th place)
 Choi In-ae — did not finish (→ no ranking)

Diving

Women's 3m Springboard
 Kim Myong-son
 Preliminary Heat — 232.65 points (→ did not advance, 28th place)

 Kim Hye-ok
 Preliminary Heat — 206.64 points (→ did not advance, 29th place)

Women's 10m Platform
Kim Chun-ok
Preliminary Round — 282.36 points (→ 18th place)

Ryu Un-Sil
Preliminary Round — 282.36 points (→ 23rd place)

Gymnastics

Judo

Rhythmic gymnastics

Shooting

Table tennis

Weightlifting

Wrestling

References

External links
Official Olympic Reports
International Olympic Committee results database

Korea, North
1992
1992 in North Korean sport